Lovington is a village in Moultrie County, Illinois, United States. The population was 1,069 at the 2020 census. Lovington was named after Andrew Love, the first postmaster in the area.

Geography

Demographics

As of the census of 2000, there were 1,222 people, 504 households, and 338 families residing in the village. The racial makeup of the village was 98.77% White, 0.25% African American, 0.57% Native American, 0.25% Asian, and 0.16% from two or more races. Hispanic or Latino of any race were 0.33% of the population.

There were 504 households, out of which 31.5% had children under the age of 18 living with them, 54.4% were married couples living together, 7.9% had a female householder with no husband present, and 32.9% were non-families. 29.8% of all households were made up of individuals, and 16.7% had someone living alone who was 65 years of age or older. The average household size was 2.39 and the average family size was 2.95.

In the village, the population was spread out, with 25.0% under the age of 18, 9.6% from 18 to 24, 28.6% from 25 to 44, 19.4% from 45 to 64, and 17.4% who were 65 years of age or older. The median age was 37 years. For every 100 females, there were 92.4 males. For every 100 females age 18 and over, there were 86.6 males.

The median income for a household in the village was $34,115, and the median income for a family was $41,544. Males had a median income of $31,786 versus $20,800 for females. The per capita income for the village was $17,311. About 6.5% of families and 8.7% of the population were below the poverty line, including 9.8% of those under age 18 and 12.1% of those age 65 or over.

Lovington High School

Lovington High School was shut down in 2012, and the building that had stood since 1909 was torn down after the district annexed into Arthur, Illinois. The new high school encompasses the surrounding towns and is called Arthur Lovington Atwood Hammond (ALAH) High School.

Notable persons

 Stephen Ambrose, historian, biographer of Presidents Dwight D. Eisenhower and Richard Nixon
 Chas McFarland - a professional basketball player for the Akita Northern Happinets of Japan
 Don Shroyer - former head football coach for Millikin University

References

External links
Lovington, Illinois
Lovington School

Villages in Moultrie County, Illinois
Villages in Illinois